Frank Sullivan (June 16, 1929 – April 5, 2009) was a Canadian professional ice hockey player who played eight games in the National Hockey League for the Toronto Maple Leafs and Chicago Black Hawks between 1950 and 1956. The rest of his career, which lasted from 1949 to 1959, was mainly spent in the American Hockey League.

Sullivan was born in Toronto, Ontario, Canada. Frank was the brother of Peter Sullivan.

Career statistics

Regular season and playoffs

References

External links
 

1929 births
2009 deaths
Buffalo Bisons (AHL) players
Canadian ice hockey defencemen
Chicago Blackhawks players
Ontario Hockey Association Senior A League (1890–1979) players
Oshawa Generals players
Pittsburgh Hornets players
Springfield Indians players
Ice hockey people from Toronto
Toronto Maple Leafs players
Toronto Marlboros players
Toronto St. Michael's Majors players